Tode Ilich was a mayor of Kumanovo Municipality, Macedonia. Prior to his public office function he was also director of the Zitomel company in his native town.

See also
Kumanovo Municipality

External links
Комеморација по повод смртта на Тоде Илиќ Retrieved 16.01.2014 from YouTube

References

People from Kumanovo
Kumanovo Municipality
1943 births
2014 deaths